Edward William Rollins (1 January 1852 – 1 February 1939), commonly known as Starlight, was an Australian middleweight boxer.

Boxing career
Rollins was a top middleweight contender for the Australian Middleweight Championship  during his career and fought for the title four times

During his career, Starlight defeated such men as Jack Malloy, "Black Chris" Smithers, Jim Barron, James "Tut" Ryan, Bill Heffernan, Jack Perryman, Charlie Woods and Ike Stewart.

Family
Rollins married Kate Pratt, the daughter of black American parents. They had a daughter, Marjorie Duguid, who was the grandmother of Australian pop singer Colleen Hewett.

References

External links 
 

1852 births
1939 deaths
Sportspeople from Georgetown, Guyana
Australian male boxers
Guyanese male boxers
Australian people of Guyanese descent
Guyanese emigrants to Australia
Middleweight boxers